T. Vaiphei (born 1 March 1956) is an Indian Judge and former Chief Justice of the High Court of Tripura. He is the first judicial officer from Mizo-Vaiphei community to be elevated to the position of Chief Justice of High Courts of India.

Early life
Vaiphei was born in 1956. He passed B.A. in 1976 from Nowrosjee Wadia College of University of Poona and in 1979 he passed LL.B. from Faculty of Law, University of Delhi.

Career
Vaiphei became enrolled in the Bar Council of Assam in 1980 and started practice in the lower courts of Manipur in Criminal and Civil side. He also worked in Constitutional and Service Matters in the Imphal Bench of the Gauhati High Court in 1990. In 1997 he shifted to Mizoram and was appointed Assistant Advocate General of Mizoram on 12 February 1999. On 15 September 2000, Vaiphei became Additional Advocate General of Mizoram. He was elevated as Additional Judge of the Gauhati High Court on 17 July 2003. Justice Vaiphei also took charge of the acting Chief Justice of the High Court. He was appointed the Chief Justice of the Tripura High Court on 21 September 2016 and retired on 28 February 2018. After the retirement he was appointed the Chairperson of Assam Human Rights Commission in 2018.

References

1956 births
Living people
Indian judges
People from Mizoram
Judges of the Gauhati High Court
Chief Justices of the Tripura High Court
Delhi University alumni
21st-century Indian judges
21st-century Indian lawyers